Matt Levine or Matthew Levine may refer to:

Matt Levine (entrepreneur), American entrepreneur and restaurateur
Matt Levine (columnist), writer for Bloomberg News

See also
Matthew Levin (disambiguation)